Stanley Eyre Bowdle (September 4, 1868 – April 6, 1919) was an American lawyer and politician who served as a U.S. Representative from Ohio for one term from 1913 to 1915.

Early life and career 
Born in Clifton, Cincinnati, Ohio, Bowdle attended the public schools until fifteen years of age.
He served an apprenticeship of three years in the machine shops of Cramp's shipyard, Philadelphia, Pennsylvania.
He studied law, and was graduated from the Cincinnati Law School in 1889.
He was admitted to the bar the same year and commenced practice in Cincinnati.

He spent the summers in the mountains of Colorado and winters in various places in Mexico from 1897 to 1900 in an attempt to recover from tuberculosis. He married Lillian Crane Scott while still in Colorado on November 29, 1900. She had one daughter named Virginia.

He returned to Cincinnati and resumed his profession.
He served as member of the State constitutional convention in 1912.

Congress 
Bowdle was elected as a Democrat to the Sixty-third Congress (March 4, 1913 – March 3, 1915).
He was an unsuccessful candidate for reelection in 1914 to the Sixty-fourth Congress and in 1916 to the Sixty-fifth Congress.

Later career and death 

In later years, he became a member of the Episcopal Church.

He served as mayor of Clifton, Cincinnati, Ohio and engaged in the practice of law in Cincinnati.

He died there on April 6, 1919, a few hours after being struck by an automobile after stepping from a streetcar near the Good Samaritan Hospital.

He was interred in Spring Grove Cemetery.

Sources

1868 births
1919 deaths
University of Cincinnati College of Law alumni
People from Clark County, Ohio
Road incident deaths in Ohio
Pedestrian road incident deaths
Burials at Spring Grove Cemetery

Democratic Party members of the United States House of Representatives from Ohio
Ohio Constitutional Convention (1912)
Mayors of places in Ohio
Politicians from Cincinnati
19th-century American politicians